Rangeli Raja is a 1971 Telugu-language, action-drama film, produced by C. Lakshmi Rajyam, C. Sridhar Rao, and Sundarlal Nehata under the Rajyam Productions banner. and directed by C. S. Rao It stars Akkineni Nageswara Rao, Kanchana and music has been composed by Ghantasala.

Plot
The film begins with Raobahadur Jaganatha Rao being slaughtered in a mysterious situation and his trustworthy Ramadasu is incriminated. So, he flees along with Jaganatha Rao's property to safeguard it. Next, he covers his identity by tilting himself as Hanumantha Rao. Plus, he is on the hunt for Jaganatha Rao's wife Parvathamma & son Raja to retrieve their wealth. Bearing in mind that Ramudasu is his husband's homicide frightened Parvathamma takes shelter at her brother Narasimham's residence. Ramadasu has two daughters Jaya & Vijaya. Once Jaya is lifted by a thief which leads to the demise of his wife Lakshmi. Years roll by, and Raja grows up as a jovial & energetic guy.

At one time, involuntarily, he is aware of his father's assignation and proceeds for vengeance. Parallelly, a notorious criminal gang headed by a person under a veil entrusts the pursuit of Raja to his son Kumar. Raja lands in the town and makes a friendship with a vagabond Chandram who aids him in the hunt for Ramadasu. Anyhow, loyal Ramadasu still seeks to find out the whereabouts of Jaganatha Rao's family. Besides, Raja gets acquainted with Vijaya and they fell in love. Jaya a petty thief, Ramadasu's misplaced daughter is fostered by a poor man who endears Chandram. Ahead, Kumar is behind Raja but every time he gamely gives them a check. Chandram cleverly ties up with them and backs Raja.

Meanwhile, Ramadasu discovers the love affair of Raja & Vijaya which he opposes as per the word to knit her with Jaganatha Rao's son. Simultaneously, before leaving the breath Jaya's foster father proclaims Chandra her birth secret. As soon as, he discerns Jaya as Ramadasu's daughter Moreover, he detects Ramadasu is only Hanumantha Rao and notifies the head of the gang. Unfortunately, Raja is clutched by Kumar when the head orders him to capture Parvathamma too, which he does so. Here as a flabbergast, the head is unmasked as Narasimham and is the true killer of Jaganatha Rao which startles Parvatamma & Raja. At present, Narasimham forges Kumar Jaganatha Rao's heir by threaning Parvathamma and they reach Ramadasu to procure the riches. Forthwith, Ramadasu fixes the alliance for Kumar & Vijaya. At that point surprisingly, Chandram turns into a CBI Officer who frees Raja and reaches the venue. At last, Raja ceases the baddies and Ramadasu regains Jaya too. Finally, the movie ends on a happy note with the marriages of Raja & Vijaya and Chandram & Jaya.

Cast 
Akkineni Nageswara Rao as Raja
Kanchana as Vijaya
S. V. Ranga Rao as Raobahadur Jaganatha Rao (Photo)
Gummadi as Ramadasu / Hanumantha Rao
Satyanarayana as Kumar
Mukkamala as Narasimham
Allu Ramalingaiah as Kailasam
Chalam as Chandram
Chalapathi Rao as C.I.D / Dadhel Khan
Lakshmi Rajyam as Parvathamma
Vandana as Jaya
Jayakumari as Gowri
Jhansi as Lakshmi

Crew 
Art: G. V. Subba Rao
Choreography: Chinni-Sampath
Stills: Satyam
Fights: Raghavulu
Dialogues: Bhamidipati Radhakrishna
Lyrics: C. Narayana Reddy, Dasarathi, Arudra, Kosaraju
Playback: Ghantasala, P. Susheela, L. R. Eswari, Vasantha
Music: Ghantasala
Story: A. K. Velan
Editing: S. P. S. Veerappa
Cinematography: Kamal Ghosh
Presenter: Sunderlal Nahata
Producers: Sridhara Rao, Lakshmi Rajyam
Director: C. S. Rao
Banner: Rajyam Productions
Release Date: 17 December 1971

Soundtrack

References

External links 
 

1970s Telugu-language films
Indian action drama films
Films scored by Ghantasala (musician)
1970s action drama films
1971 drama films